Saat Bangla is a neighbourhood in Versova, Andheri, Mumbai.

History and etymology 
The area is said to derive its name from seven bungalows owned by then country's who's who - the Maharaja of Gwalior, the Maharaja of Kutch, Dadabhai Naoroji, Sir Rustom Masani, Sorabjee Talati, Kaiki Villa, the Khambatta's and the Chinai's. Of which now only the bungalow of Chinai's built in the 1930s by Claude Batley, a British architect, for Maneklal Chunilal Chinai, a wealthy textile merchant, remains in its originality.

Parks 
There are two parks in the locality. The first one is the Dadabhai Navroji Garden, also known as Seven Bungalows Garden, which is maintained by the Municipal Corporation of Greater Mumbai. The other is the Nana Nani Park, located opposite it.

Transport 

The Brihanmumbai Electricity Supply and Transport Undertaking (BEST) operates a bus station at Seven Bungalows. Bus services connect the area with places like Andheri railway station, and Bhayandar railway station.

The western terminal station on Line 1 of the Mumbai Metro, Versova metro station is also located at Seven Bungalows.

Seven Bungalows lies on the arterial Jayaprakash Narayan Road (JP Road) which connects it to Andheri railway station and Versova.

References 

Suburbs of Mumbai
Andheri